World One is a , 76 floor skyscraper in Mumbai, Maharashtra, India. It is on the  site of the defunct Shrinivas Mill. The site also houses two other towers: World View and World Crest. The complex was developed by the Lodha Group.

World One was being built at an estimated cost of over US $321 million. As the developer failed to obtain approval from the Airports Authority of India for that height, the project was stalled for few years. Following the delay, the project was redesigned to the current height and completed.

World One's architect is Pei Cobb Freed & Partners, the structural engineer is Leslie E. Robertson Associates & MEP engineer is Buro Happold Engineers. The whole project i.e. The World Towers consists of three towers. There were two construction civil contractors involved: Arabian Construction Co. and Simplex (World One), Muscovite Group (World Crest, World View). Indian Millionaires also take part of this huge tower and some own a percentage.

History
The Lodha Group purchased the  site of the defunct Shrinivas Mill in Lower Parel, Mumbai from Shrinivas Cotton in 2005. In 2010, the developer announced the project to construct the World One tower at the site of the defunct mill. The Lodha Group would also construct the World View tower and the World Crest tower, on the same site, as part of the project. World One initially faced opposition from the Directorate General of Civil Aviation (DGCA) over security concerns related to the height of the building. World One was built at an estimated cost of over US$321 million. The interiors of the tower were designed by Giorgio Armani, and includes a swimming pool, gym and health club, cricket pitches and a pavilion. The 117-storey tower would have contained 290 apartments, some of which overlook the Arabian Sea.

The contract to construct World One was awarded to a joint venture between UAE-based Arabian Construction Company and Simplex Infrastructure. Construction on World One began in 2011. By December 2014, about 75% of civil construction on the project had been completed. By June 2015, 70% of the tower was complete, with 83 floors having been built.

The Lodha Group opened bookings for apartments at World One on 29 November 2011. When the first round of bookings closed on 14 December 2014, Lodha had received  worth of bookings, at an approximate rate of over – per sq ft. The tower is composed of 3 and 4 BHK apartments. Lodha began offering apartments at World One for sale in London in February 2015. The company hired London estate agent, Wetherell Estates, to market and sell homes in the tower. Lodha particularly hoped to target high net worth Indians living in Mayfair, London.

HDFC Property Fund invested 500 crore to acquire a 10% stake in the World Towers project in 2010. The firm exited the project in October 2016, earning a return of triple their investment. In September 2016, Piramal Fund Management Pvt. Ltd invested 2,320 crore in the World Towers project.

The developer failed to obtain approval from Airports Authority of India for  height in 2010 and  height in 2015, so as of 2018 World One still has approval for  height only (approximately 76 floors). The project was redesigned for that height.

World View and World Crest
There are two other towers under this project:
Construction of the tower began in 2015, and was completed in 2020. As of 2022, the tower is the second tallest completed building in India.
Construction of the tower began in 2011, and was completed in 2017.

Controversy
Several construction projects in Mumbai by The Lodha Group currently face considerable public ire on grounds of questionable construction practices, public safety, and misrepresentation of the areas being sold to customers. The Lodha Group has tried to fight this through legal gag orders and defamation policies on digital platforms, but has found only limited success.

Gallery

See also
 List of tallest buildings in Mumbai
 List of tallest buildings in India
 List of tallest residential buildings
 List of tallest buildings in different cities in India
 List of buildings with 100 floors or more

References

External links

 
 
 
 

Residential skyscrapers in Mumbai
Residential buildings completed in 2019
Skyscrapers in India